Leigh Tesfatsion is a computational economist who taught at Iowa State University. She received her doctorate at the University of Minnesota, and taught at the University of Southern California before moving to Iowa State. She is known for promoting agent-based models as an alternative to rational expectations general equilibrium models for studying markets, finance, and macroeconomic phenomena. Her works are widely cited in the literature on the subject.

Selected publications
 Leigh Tesfatsion, 1997. "How Economists Can Get Alife," in W. B. Arthur, S. Durlauf, and D. Lane, eds., The Economy as an Evolving Complex System, II,  pp. 533–564. Addison-Wesley. Pre-publication PDF.
_, 2001. "Introduction to the Special Issue on Agent-based Computational Economics," Journal of Economic Dynamics & Control, 25(3-4), pp.  281-293.
 _, 2002. "Agent-Based Computational Economics: Growing Economies From the Bottom Up," Artificial Life, 8(1), pp. 55–82. Abstract and pre-publication  PDF.
 _, 2003. "Agent-based Computational Economics: Modeling Economies as Complex Adaptive Systems," Information Sciences, 149(4), pp. 262-268.
 _, 2006. "Agent-Based Computational Economics: A Constructive Approach to Economic Theory," ch. 16, Handbook of Computational Economics, v. 2, pp. 831–880. Abstract/outline. 2005 prepublication PDF.
 _ and Kenneth L. Judd, eds., 2006. Handbook of Computational Economics, Volume 2, Agent-Based Computational Economics, Handbooks in Economics Series, Elsevier/North-Holland, Amsterdam. .  Description and chapter-preview links.

See also
 Agent-based computational economics
 Macroeconomic model

Notes

External links
 Leigh Tesfatsion's homepage
 Agent-Based Computational Economics - maintained by Leigh Tesfatsion

Computational economists
University of Minnesota alumni
21st-century American economists
1940s births
Living people